Roveys Tameh (also Romanized as Roveys Ţaʿmeh; also known as Barzīn, Rovays, Roveys, and Rūveys) is a village in Jazireh-ye Minu Rural District, Minu District, Khorramshahr County, Khuzestan Province, Iran. At the 2006 census, its population was 148, in 36 families.

References 

Populated places in Khorramshahr County